Israel Paldi (Feldman) (1892–1979) was an Israeli artist.

Biography 
Israel Feldman (later Paldi) was born in 1892 in Ukraine. In 1909 he immigrated to Palestine and began to study art at the Bezalel School in Jerusalem. He returned to Europe to study at Munich Academy from 1911 – 1914.

After winning a prize in Paris in 1926 for his work on a stage set for "The Fisherman's Tent," he went on to win the Dizengoff Prize for Painting and Sculpture in Tel Aviv three times: 1943, 1953 and 1959.

References

External links 
 
 
 

1892 births
1979 deaths
20th-century Israeli painters
Burials at Kiryat Shaul Cemetery